Joseph Granby (March 24, 1885 – September 22, 1965) was an American film actor whose career spanned from 1915 to the 1960s. 

Born in Boston he started in movies in 1915, mostly shorts, acting for Universal, its predecessor Independent Motion Picture Company, Rex, Victor and others and appeared at Fox Studios supporting Valeska Suratt in her vamp-style films. His final silent film was in 1921 and for the rest of the 1920s and 1930s appeared in Broadway plays (begun in 1911).

When he returned to motion pictures in 1943, his appearances were uncredited. His final years saw work in television shows and movies. Granby is best remembered as the voice of an Angel in the classic holiday film It's a Wonderful Life. 

He died September 22, 1965.

Partial filmography
His New Automobile (1915) *short
The Haunted Bell (1916) *short
The Capital Prize (1916) *short
The Man from Nowhere (1916)
The Crystal's Warning (1916) *short
Temptation and the Man (1916)
Achenbrodel (1916) *short
The Lie Sublime (1916) *short
The Mantle of Deceit (1916) *short
Jealousy (1916)
Ashes (1916)
It Didn't Work Out Right (1916)
The Accomplice (1917)
Rasputin, the Black Monk (1917)
The Awakening (1917)
Peck's Bad Girl (1918)
The Great Romance (1919)
A Proxy Husband (1919) *short
The Imp (1919)
Black Is White (1920)
Chain of Evidence (1920)
Diane of Star Hollow (1921)
The Cross of Lorraine (1943) *uncredited
Kismet (1944) *uncredited
And Now Tomorrow (1944) *uncredited
The Great Flamarion (1945) *uncredited
The Phantom Speaks (1945) *uncredited
Danny Boy (1945)
O.S.S. (1946) *uncredited
Her Adventurous Night (1946) *uncredited
The Stranger (1946) *uncredited
The Return of Monte Cristo (1946) *uncredited
It's a Wonderful Life (1946) *voice only, uncredited
I'll Be Yours (1947) *uncredited
Monsieur Verdoux (1947) *uncredited
Magic Town (1947) *uncredited
The Lady from Shanghai (1947) *uncredited
Here Comes Trouble (1948) *uncredited
Kiss the Blood Off My Hands (1948) *uncredited
Joan of Arc (1948) *uncredited

References

External links
Internet Movie Database
IBDB
Joseph Granby as a Laurel & Hardy player
Joseph Granby in the 1940s(archived)
Jealousy (1916) photo with Granby and Valeska Suratt page 107 top Pictorial History of the Silent Screen
Joseph Granby(Aveleyman)
kinotv

1885 births
1965 deaths
20th-century American male actors
American male silent film actors
American male stage actors
American male television actors
Male actors from Boston